Tapura Huiraatira is a political party in French Polynesia. It was founded on 20 February 2016 by members of Tahoera'a Huiraatira, a parliamentary coalition in the Assembly of French Polynesia. It is chaired by Édouard Fritch, the President of French Polynesia. Its first congress was attended by 8,000 people, including 38 Polynesian mayors. Nicole Sanquer was the party's only Member of Parliament before she left to join A here ia Porinetia.

They wish to maintain political autonomy within the French Republic and continue to grow that relationship while strengthening ties with Oceania, given their geographical position.

The party won 49 percent of the vote and 38 seats in the 2018 French Polynesian legislative election. Fritch was re-elected as President of French Polynesia, while Gaston Tong Sang was elected President of the Assembly.

In March 2019 the party declared its support for La République En Marche! in the 2019 European Parliament election, resulting in criticism from its National Assembly and Senate members over a lack of consultation.

In September 2022 Teva Rohfritsch, Nicole Bouteau and Philip Schyle resigned from the party, citing disappointment with Edouard Fritch's government.

The party submitted its list for the 2023 French Polynesian legislative election on 17 March 2023.

References

External links
 

Political parties in French Polynesia
2016 establishments in French Polynesia
Political parties established in 2016